YLJ may refer to:

 Yale Law Journal, a journal of legal scholarship published by students at Yale Law School
 Meadow Lake Airport (Saskatchewan) (IATA: YLJ)